The Association des Guides du Rwanda (AGR; Rwanda Girl Guides Association) is the national Girl Guides organization of Rwanda. The association served 13,807 members (as of 2013). Founded in 1962, the girl serving organization became a full member of the World Association of Girl Guides and Girl Scouts in 1981.

Program and ideals
The Guide Motto is Uwe Tayari, Be Prepared in Swahili, Ube Maso in Kinyarwanda, and Sois Prêt in French.

The Guide emblem incorporates the color scheme of the flag of Rwanda.

Sources
 Rwanda Girl Guides official website

See also

 Rwanda Scouts Association

World Association of Girl Guides and Girl Scouts member organizations
Scouting and Guiding in Rwanda
Youth organizations established in 1962
1962 establishments in Ruanda-Urundi